These are the official results of the Women's Marathon competition at the 1998 European Championships in Budapest, Hungary. The race was held on Sunday August 23, 1998.

Medalists

Abbreviations
All times shown are in hours:minutes:seconds

Records

Final ranking

See also
 1998 European Marathon Cup

External links
 Results
 todor66
 marathonspiegel

Marathon, Women
Marathons at the European Athletics Championships
1998 marathons
Women's marathons
1998 in women's athletics
Marathons in Hungary